Computational Fluid Dynamics (CFD) modeling and simulation for phase change materials (PCMs) is a technique to analyze the performance and behavior of PCMs. The CFD models have been successful in studying and analyzing the air quality, natural ventilation and stratified ventilation, air flow initiated by buoyancy forces and temperature space for the systems integrated with PCMs. Simple shapes like flat plates, cylinders or annular tubes, fins, macro- and micro-encapsulations with containers of different shape are often modeled in CFD software's to study.

Typically the CFD models generally include Reynold’s Averaged Navier-Stokes equation (RANS) modeling and Large Eddy Simulation (LES). Conservation equations of mass, momentum and energy (Navier – Stokes) are linearised, discretised, and applied to finite volumes to obtain a detailed solution for field distributions of air pressure, velocity and temperature for both indoor spaces integrated with PCMs.

Governing Equations

Mass Equation

where
ρ is fluid density,
t is time,
u is the flow velocity vector field
S_m is a Constant.

Energy Equation

where
ρ is the fluid mass density,
S_E is the source term.

Navier Stokes equation

Here f represents "other" body forces (per unit volume), such as gravity or centrifugal force.  The shear stress term  becomes , where  is the vector Laplacian.

Boussinesq eddy-viscosity approximation 

where
 is the mean rate of strain tensor
 is the turbulence eddy viscosity
 is the turbulence kinetic energy

Assumptions
commonly used assumptions are
Incompressible fluid,
Boussinesq approximation (density is considered constant, except in the gravity forces term).
Constant thermo-physical properties (properties of solid and liquid states are assumed to be equal)

Phase Change Model
Two main thermal characteristics of phase change are the enthalpy-temperature relationship and temperature hysteresis. PCMs tend to have varying enthalpy temperature relationships due to the fact that they are blends of different materials, but pure PCMs have a more localized relationship, which can be approximated by single values for the enthalpy and phase change temperature.

Hysteresis is the phenomenon which causes the PCM to melt and freezes in different temperature ranges and with different enthalpies, which results in a different temperature-enthalpy curve for melting and freezing. Hysteresis is related to the chemical and kinetic properties of the material.

The commonly used enthalpy-porosity model in commercial CFD codes assumes, a linear enthalpy-temperature relationship and ignores hysteresis.[8]

The alternate is to use enthalpy-porosity method. When used to simulate PCM sails and a PCM plate-fin unit it produce reasonable temperature prediction in global space temperature terms. However there are inaccuracies in transient simulations where time dependent PCM and local wall and air temperatures are of interest. This is over come by use of source terms that considers hysteresis and varying enthalpy-temperature relationship. [9][10]

CFD-DEM model are also used sometimes. Phase motion of discrete solids or particles is obtained by the Discrete Element Method (DEM) which applies Newton's laws of motion to every particle and the flow of continuum fluid is described by the local averaged Navier–Stokes equations that can be solved by the traditional Computational Fluid Dynamics (CFD).CFDEMcoupling (DCS Computing GmbH) is one such open source toolbox for CFD-DEM coupling.

Process
The Governing equations are discretized using an explicit Finite Volume Method. The velocity-pressure coupling is resolved by adopting a Fractional Step Method. The adoption of the enthalpy method allows working with a fixed grid instead of an interface tracking method.

The momentum source term intended to model the presence of solid is only needed in the control volumes that contain solid and liquid, not in the pure solid containing volumes.

The final form of the source term coefficient(S)depends on the approximation adopted for the behavior of the flow in the “mushy zone” (where mixed solid and liquid states are present). However, in the case of constant phase change temperature, the solid-liquid interface should be of infinitesimal width (although it cannot be thinner than one control volume width in our simulations); therefore, the formulation used for the source term is not very important in a physical sense, as long as it manages to bring the velocity to zero in mostly solid control volumes and to vanish if the volume contains pure liquid.[11]

Applications 
CFD applications for latent thermal energy storage in PCM
The various CFD codes[1-3]  has been employed for the modeling and simulation of the PCM system to understand the heat transfer mechanism, solidification and melting process, distribution of temperature profile and prediction of the air flow. Various commercial packages have been coupled with the CFD analysis to appreciate the feasibility of evaluating the behavior of PCM integrated system.

CFD modeling in PCM in mobilized thermal energy storage
The simulated heat transfer behavior of the PCM in Mobilized Thermal Energy Storage, during the charging process can be successfully conducted by CFD modeling [4] The Volume-Of-Fluid method is employed to solve for the temperature distribution in the multiphase, 2-dimensional pressure-based model. It accounts for the heat transfer mechanism, melting time, and the influence of the structure in charging process using Fluent 12.1. The governing equations employed are mass conversion and continuity equations.

CFD analysis on selection of geometry and type of PCM to be used
Integral, quasi-1D calculations have been reported [5] mainly for conduction-dominated problem using CFD simulation. It was reported that out of three geometries (cubic, cylindrical and spherical), the spherical capsule will have the maximum heat for the heat transfer fluid. Also it is concluded that salt hydrates based PCMs are the better choice over organic PCMs.

CFD analysis on PCM in shell and tube latent thermal heat storage system

The systems are developed in such manner that phase change materials are in the shell portion of the module and passage for the flow of air through the tubes. Conjugate steady state CFD heat transfer analysis has been carried out [6] to analyze the flow and temperature variation of heat transfer fluid in the system. It paves the way for selection and assessment of the geometrical and flow parameters, PCM solidification characteristics for the given boundary conditions

The comparative analysis, to further enhance the effectiveness of shell and tube PCMs has also been accomplished via CFD analysis[7]. Various CFD models with different configuration such as pins embedded on a tube with heat transfer fluid (HTF) flowing in it, with PCM surrounding the tube, fins embedded instead of pins and different configurations of fins on the tube are analyzed, by employing ANSYS code.

References
[1] N. Tay, F. Bruno, M. Belusko. Experimental validation of a CFD model for tubes in a phase change thermal energy storage system. International Journal of Heat and Mass Transfer. 55 (2012) 574-85.
[2] G. Zhou, Y. Zhang, Q. Zhang, K. Lin, H. Di. Performance of a hybrid heating system with thermal storage using shape-stabilized phase-change material plates. Applied Energy. 84 (2007) 1068-77.
[3] C. Arkar, S. Medved. Influence of accuracy of thermal property data of a phase change material on the result of a numerical model of a packed bed latent heat storage with spheres. Thermochimica Acta. 438 (2005) 192-201.
[4] A. Hesaraki, J. Yan, H. Li. CFD modeling of heat charging process in a direct-contact container: for mobilized thermal energy storage. LAP LAMBERT Academic Publishing2012.
[5] E.B. Retterstøl. Thermal energy storage for environmental energy supply.  (2012).
[6] V. Antony Aroul Raj, R. Velraj. Heat transfer and pressure drop studies on a PCM-heat exchanger module for free cooling applications. International Journal of Thermal Sciences. 50 (2011) 1573-82.
[7] N. Tay, F. Bruno, M. Belusko. Comparison of pinned and finned tubes in a phase change thermal energy storage system using CFD. Applied Energy. 104 (2013) 79-86.
[8] Mehling H, Cabeza LF, Heat and cold storage with PCM. 1st Ed. Springer-Verlag Heidelberg; 2008
[9] Ye WB, Zhu DS, Wang N. Numerical simulation on phase-change thermal storage/ release in a plate-fin unit, Applied Thermal Engineering 31 (2011), pp. 3871–3884
[10] Gowreesunker BL, Tassou SA, Kolokotroni M. Improved simulation of phase change processes in applications where conduction is the dominant heat transfer mode, Energy and Buildings 47 (2012),pp. 353–359
[11] P. A. Galione et al., Numerical Simulations of Thermal Energy Storage Systems With Phase Change Materials.

Computational fluid dynamics
Phase transitions